Ulster County Area Transit (UCAT) is the county-owned operator of bus transportation in Ulster County, New York, providing fixed-route, deviated-fixed route, and commuter transit.

Service area
UCAT provides service primarily in the corridors of the major state and U.S. highways traversing Ulster County,  servicing primarily the Route 209, Route 28, Route 32,  Route 9W and Route 299 corridors. Service is also provided out of the county to Poughkeepsie and Newburgh for connections with Metro-North Railroad at Poughkeepsie, and Short Line Bus in Newburgh and Ellenville. Within Ulster County, connections are available to Trailways of New York inter-city and commuter services to both New York City and Albany.

Routes
The full route is given. UCAT is a fixed route provider with complementary paratransit mirroring the fixed route time tables and servicing an area 1 1/2 miles on either side of the fixed route.
In 2010, the routes were given letters (previously, routes were identified by destination only). Those are also denoted in the table below.

Weekday service

Weekend service 
On Saturdays, the following services operate:
Ulster-Poughkeepsie LINK
Route K (weekday route)
Route S (weekday route)
Route E (weekday route)
Route Z (weekday route)

On Sundays, only the Ulster-Poughkeepsie LINK operates.

Former Routes

Fleet
All buses are assigned to UCAT local service except where otherwise noted. These assignments are not always followed. Paratransit buses occasionally used in revenue service as well. Accurate as of 11/2020.

See also
Trailways of New York, the major private carrier in Ulster County along Routes 28 and 32

References

External links
Ulster County Area Transit

Transportation in Ulster County, New York
Surface transportation in Greater New York